The Man Who Went Back (1940) is an adventure novel by Warwick Deeping about a man who has a car accident in 1939 England. He is transported back into post-Roman Britain and has to contend with the knowledge that he is from the future, in the past.

Upon release, the New York Times described the book as a "remarkable merger" of Deeping's prior novels with "cloak-and-sword" settings and those set in contemporary times, resulting in an "odd but earnest novel."

References

  www.warwickdeeping.com

1940 British novels
1940 fantasy novels
1940 science fiction novels
Novels about time travel
British science fiction novels
British fantasy novels
Alfred A. Knopf books
Cassell (publisher) books
Novels by Warwick Deeping
Fiction set in 1939
Novels set in sub-Roman Britain